Kgosi Puso Gaborone (born  11 November 1975)  is the paramount chief (Kgosi) of the BaTlokwa tribe of Tlokweng in Botswana. As of 2021, he serves as the elected chairperson of Botswana's Ntlo ya Dikgosi (House of Chiefs), a position he has held since 2009.

Background and education 
Born in November 1975, he is the only son of the late Kgosi Moshibidu Gaborone and grandson of Kgosi Gaborone. Kgosi was educated at Batlokwa National School. Prior to him being a chief he was a teacher.  His coronation was held at the Tlokweng Kgotla in a ceremony attended by the Former President of Botswana, Festus Mogae and the  late  Ketumile Masire, Batlokwa chiefs from South Africa and Lesotho, community leaders and members of the community as a whole.

Batlokwa throne 
Puso Gaborone ascended the Batlokwa throne in August 2007 after his father died in 2005. In his capacity as the Kgosi of Batlokwa, he has been elected and re-elected as the chairperson of Botswana's Ntlo ya Dikgosi (House of Chiefs).

Personal life 
Kgosi Puso Gaborone married Thandi Tshepo Leshomo Gaborone in August 2016 and the couple has one child. It was also reported that he "had led by example" by taking the COVID-19 vaccination with his wife in March 2021.

See also 

 List of rulers of Tlôkwa
 Ntlo ya Dikgosi

References 

1975 births
Botswana chiefs
Living people